Nigel Levings is an Australian stage lighting designer. He has designed lights for over 500 productions. He works extensively on operas, and has designed a large portion of Opera Australia's repertoire. Some of his most significant works include operas such as The Demon at the Bregenz Festival and for Zurich Opera; Billy Budd for the Welsh National Opera, Opera Australia, Canadian Opera Company, and for the English National Opera; Nabucco for Opera Australia; Wozzeck for Opera Australia; L'Orfeo for Innsbrucker Festwochen der Alten Musik and the Berlin State Opera; A Midsummer Night's Dream for the 1994 Edinburgh Festival; La Belle Vivette for the English National Opera; Simon Boccanegra for the Royal Opera House, Washington National Opera, and Dallas Opera; Falstaff for Théâtre du Châtelet; Idomeneo, Turandot, and The Barber of Seville for the Houston Grand Opera; and Queen of Spades for the Dallas Opera.

He has also designed lights for such Broadway shows as The King and I and La Bohème.

Awards 
Levings' design for La Bohème won the Outer Critics Circle Award, Drama Desk Award, and Tony Award for Best Lighting Design in 2003, and Ovation Award in 2004. Additionally, his design for The King and I won the Outer Critics Circle Award and was nominated for both the Drama Desk Award and the Tony Award for Best Lighting Design. His lighting for Billy Budd won the Dora Mavor Moore Award for Outstanding Lighting Design in 2000.

References 

Dora Mavor Moore Award winners
Lighting designers
Living people
Helpmann Award winners
Year of birth missing (living people)